Group Captain Alan John Lance Scott,  (29 June 1883 – 16 January 1922) was an officer in the Royal Flying Corps and Royal Air Force during the First World War and the following years.

Early life
Scott was born in Christchurch, New Zealand, on 29 June 1883, but moved to in England where he attended Oxford University, from which he graduated with a law degree. He practiced as a barrister in London, and was acquainted with Lord Birkenhead and Winston Churchill.

First World War
He was originally an officer in the British Army's Sussex Yeomanry, later transferring to the Royal Flying Corps. Scott never became a very good pilot; in fact, in training, he crashed and broke both legs. He continued training on canes, and had to be assisted into the cockpit. However, he was a pugnacious dogfighter whose solo missions sometimes got him into trouble. For instance, on 28 May 1917, he survived being Leutnant Karl Allmenröder's 21st victory.

In July 1917 Scott was awarded the Military Cross:

Scott was a flight commander on No. 43 Squadron RFC until 10 March 1917 when he took up command of No. 60 Squadron RFC. He remained as No. 60 Squadron's commander until 11 July 1917, the day after he was wounded in action.
 
From some time in 1917 to 1918, Scott was the Commandant of the Central Flying School. Notably, Scott acted as Winston Churchill's flying instructor.

Later life
In 1920, Scott's book "Sixty Squadron RAF: A history of the squadron from its formation" was published. Scott died on 16 January 1922 in London, England aged 38.

References

Footnotes

Bibliography

 Nieuport Aces of World War 1. Norman Franks. Osprey Publishing, 2000. .
 Above the Trenches: a Complete Record of the Fighter Aces and Units of the British Empire Air Forces 1915–1920. Christopher F. Shores, Norman L. R. Franks, Russell Guest. Grub Street, 1990. .

External links

|-
 

1883 births
1922 deaths
British Army personnel of World War I
Military personnel from Christchurch
Royal Flying Corps officers
Royal Air Force officers
Royal Air Force personnel of World War I
Companions of the Order of the Bath
New Zealand recipients of the Air Force Cross (United Kingdom)
New Zealand recipients of the Military Cross
New Zealand World War I flying aces
Sussex Yeomanry officers
People from Christchurch
Alumni of the University of Oxford